Bernard Nsayi (27 June 1943 in Mindouli – 12 February 2021 in Rome) was the Roman Catholic bishop of the Roman Catholic Diocese of Nkayi, Republic of the Congo.

Nsayi was ordained to the priesthood in 1971. He served as bishop of the Diocese of Nkayi from 1990 to 2001. He died in 2021.

Notes

1943 births
2021 deaths
20th-century Roman Catholic bishops in the Republic of the Congo
People from Pool Department
Roman Catholic bishops of Nkayi